Jimmy Connors and Ilie Năstase were the defending champions, but lost in the semifinals to John Newcombe and Tony Roche.

Newcombe and Roche defeated Bob Lutz and Stan Smith in the final, 8–6, 6–4, 6–4 to win the gentlemen's doubles title at the 1974 Wimbledon Championships.

Seeds

  Jimmy Connors /  Ilie Năstase (semifinals)
  Bob Hewitt /  Frew McMillan (second round)
  Bob Lutz /  Stan Smith (final)
  John Newcombe /  Tony Roche (champions)
  Arthur Ashe /  Roscoe Tanner (third round)
  Owen Davidson /  Ken Rosewall (second round)
  Cliff Drysdale /  Tom Okker (semifinals)
  John Alexander /  Phil Dent (quarterfinals)

Draw

Finals

Top half

Section 1

Section 2

Bottom half

Section 3

Section 4

References

External links

1974 Wimbledon Championships – Men's draws and results at the International Tennis Federation

Men's Doubles
Wimbledon Championship by year – Men's doubles